The Blentones were a mid-20th century doo-wop group, based in Baltimore, where they recorded with Jack Gale. Their songs include 1959's hit "Military Kick", "Lilly" and "Come On Home" on the Success record label. They also worked with Charlie Ventura.

References

Doo-wop groups
Musical groups from Baltimore